David Garrett may refer to:

David Garrett (born 1980), German pop and crossover violinist and recording artist
David Garrett (album), 2009
David C. Garrett, Jr. (1922–2012), American businessman who was CEO of Delta Air Lines 1978–1987
David Garrett (politician) (born 1958), New Zealand lawyer and politician
David Garrett (screen writer) (active from 2005), American filmmaker

See also
David Garratt, founder of Scripture in Song